Mouralia is a genus of moths of the family Noctuidae, consisting of only one species Mouralia tinctoides. It is found from Florida to South-east Texas, Georgia, Southern California, the Antilles, from Mexico through Brazil to Northern Argentina and in Peru.

The larvae feed on Tradescantia fluminensis and Tradescantia zebrina. They are also capable of being reared on Commelina diffusa.

References

Natural History Museum Lepidoptera genus database

External links
Species info
Species info on Moths of Jamaica
Mouralia at funet

Plusiinae
Monotypic moth genera
Noctuidae of South America